Atlantosuchus is an extinct genus of dyrosaurid crocodylomorph from Morocco. One defining characteristic that distinguishes it from other long-snouted dyrosaurids was its proportionally elongate snout, the longest in proportion to body size of any dyrosaurid. Rhabdognathus, a hyposaurine dyrosaurid, is believed to have been the closest relative of the genus.

References

External links
 Atlantosuchus in the Paleobiology Database

Paleocene crocodylomorphs
Fossils of Morocco
Dyrosaurids
Prehistoric pseudosuchian genera